The 2009–10 Wisconsin Badgers men's basketball team represented University of Wisconsin–Madison. The head coach was Bo Ryan, in his ninth season with the Badgers. The team played its home games at the Kohl Center in Madison, Wisconsin, and is a member of the Big Ten Conference. They finished the season 24–9, 13–5 in Big Ten play and lost in the quarterfinals of the 2010 Big Ten Conference men's basketball tournament. They received an at–large bid the 2010 NCAA Division I men's basketball tournament, earning a 4 seed in the East Region. They defeated 13 seed Wofford in the first round before being upset by 12 seed Cornell in the second round.

Roster

Depth chart

Schedule and results

Source
All times are Central

|-
!colspan=12| Exhibition

|-
!colspan=12| Regular Season

|-
!colspan=12| 2010 Big Ten Conference men's basketball tournament

|-
!colspan=12| 2010 NCAA Division I men's basketball tournament

Rankings

2010 signing class

References

Wisconsin
Wisconsin
Wisconsin Badgers men's basketball seasons
Badge
Badge